The Macau Peninsula is the most populous and historical part of Macau. The peninsula, together with downtown Zhuhai, sits on an island separated from the continent by distributaries of the Pearl River. The Border Gate was built on the northern isthmus. At the south, the peninsula is connected to Taipa Island by three bridges, the Friendship Bridge (Ponte de Amizade); the Macau-Taipa Bridge (Ponte Governador Nobre de Carvalho); and the Sai Van Bridge (Ponte de Sai Van). The longest axis extends  from the Border Gate to the southwestern edge, Barra (媽閣嘴). There is a western "Inner Harbor" (內港) paralleled by an "Outer Harbor" (外港) to the east. Many coastal places are reclaimed from the sea. The Historic Centre of Macau, which is entirely on the Macau Peninsula, became a World Heritage Site in 2005.

Early history
In 1513, Portuguese explorer Jorge Álvares arrived in the Pearl River Delta, in the Shenzhen area, which he called Tamão. A Portuguese settlement was started there and by 1535 the traders were allowed to anchor their ships in the Macau harbour. In 1887, the Sino-Portuguese Treaty of Peking was signed, allowing "the perpetual occupation and government of Macau by Portugal".   
 
According to National Geographic, "Macau may never have existed if not for Tamão" where the Portuguese learned "how China, the Pearl River Delta, and the South China Sea worked". The settlement and Jorge Álvares "kickstarted a chain of events that ultimately spawned Macau". A large stone sculpture of Álvares still stands in downtown Macau.

Freguesias
The peninsula corresponds to the historical Municipality of Macau, one of Macau's two municipalities that were abolished on 31 December 2001 by Law No. 17/2001, following the 1999 transfer of sovereignty over Macau from Portugal to China.   

This municipality was divided into five parishes (freguesia), and while their administrative functions have since been voided, these parishes are still retained nominally.

See also 
 Coloane
 Cotai
 Friendship Bridge
 Governor Nobre de Carvalho Bridge
 Macau
 Sai Van Bridge
 Taipa

References

External links 

 Satellite image of the Macau Peninsula by Google Maps
 Macau Peninsula photo gallery

 
Peninsulas of China